May 28 - Eastern Orthodox Church calendar - May 30

All fixed commemorations below celebrated on June 11 by Orthodox Churches on the Old Calendar.

For May 29th, Orthodox Churches on the Old Calendar commemorate the Saints listed on May 16.

Saints
 Martyr Cyril of Caesarea in Cappadocia (251)
 Child-martyr Carellus, with martyrs Primolus, Phinodus, Venustus, Gissinus, Alexander, Tredentius, and Jocunda, at Caesarea in Cappadocia (253-259)
 Hieromartyr Olbian, Bishop of Anaea, and his disciples, in Asia Minor (284-303)
 Virgin-martyr Theodosia of Tyre (308)
 Martyrs Andrew (Andras) and his spouse.
 Saint Alexander of Alexandria, Patriarch of Alexandria (326)
 Venerable Jeremiah of Damascus.
 Venerable Virgin-martyr Theodosia of Constantinople (730)

Pre-Schism Western saints
 Martyr Restitutus, at Rome, on the Via Aurelia (299).
 Saint Maximinus of Trier, Bishop of Trier in Germany (352)
 Martyrs Sisinius, Martyrius, and Alexander, near Trent, in the time of Emperor Honorius (397)
 Saint Maximus of Verona, Bishop of Verona in Italy (6th century)
 Venerable Votus, Felix and John, hermits in the Pyrenees (750)
 Saint John de Atares (750)
 Saint Ethelbert the King (Æthelberht II of East Anglia) (794) (see also May 20)
 Saint Gerald, a monk at Brou, became Bishop of Mâcon, returned to his monastery 40 years later and reposed there (927)
 Saint Ulric of Einsiedeln (978) 
 Saint Eleutherius of Rocca d'Arce, Confessor, at Arcano in Lazio.

Post-Schism Orthodox saints
 * Righteous John and Mary of Ustiug (Vologda) (13th century)
 Venerable Helena Dragaš (Hypomone, Ipomoni of Loutraki) (1450)
 Blessed Constantine XI Palaiologos, last Byzantine emperor, martyred by the Ottoman Turks (1453)
 New Martyr Andrew of Argentes, in Chios (1465)
 Blessed John of Ustiug, Fool-for-Christ (1494)
 New Martyr John (or Nannus) of Smyrna (1802)
 New Hieromartyr Euthymios (Agritellis) of Zela, in Pontus, Bishop (1921)
 New Hiero-confessor Luke (Voino-Yasenetsky), Archbishop of Simferopol and Crimea and Surgeon, Unmercenary Wonderworker (1961) (see also June 11)

New martyrs and confessors
 Hieromartyr John Preobrazhensky (1938)
 Deacon Martyr Andrew Trofimov (1938)

Other commemorations
 Repose of Schemamonk Michael of Valaam (1854)
 Repose of Nun Dorothea of Sukhotin Monastery (1885)
 Uncovering of the relics (2000) of St. Job (Joshua in schema), Schemamonk of Anzersk Island, at Solovki (1720)

Icons
 Icon of the Most Holy Theotokos “Surety of Sinners” in Moscow (1848) (see also March 7)
 Icon of the Mother of God "Non-Slumbering Eye" (“Unsleeping Eye”).
 Icon of the Mother of God "Imperial" (“Tsesarskaya-Borovskaya”).

Icon gallery

Notes

References

Links
 May 29/June 11. Orthodox Calendar (PRAVOSLAVIE.RU).
 June 11 / May 29. HOLY TRINITY RUSSIAN ORTHODOX CHURCH (A parish of the Patriarchate of Moscow).
 Complete List of Saints. Protection of the Mother of God Church (POMOG).
 May 29. OCA - The Lives of the Saints.
 Dr. Alexander Roman. May. Calendar of Ukrainian Orthodox Saints (Ukrainian Orthodoxy - Українське Православ'я).
 May 29. Latin Saints of the Orthodox Patriarchate of Rome.
 May 29. The Roman Martyrology.
Greek Sources
 Great Synaxaristes:  29 ΜΑΪΟΥ. ΜΕΓΑΣ ΣΥΝΑΞΑΡΙΣΤΗΣ.
  Συναξαριστής. 29 Μαΐου. ECCLESIA.GR. (H ΕΚΚΛΗΣΙΑ ΤΗΣ ΕΛΛΑΔΟΣ). 
Russian Sources
  11 июня (29 мая). Православная Энциклопедия под редакцией Патриарха Московского и всея Руси Кирилла (электронная версия). (Orthodox Encyclopedia - Pravenc.ru).
  29 мая (ст.ст.) 11 июня 2013 (нов. ст.). Русская Православная Церковь Отдел внешних церковных связей. (DECR).

May in the Eastern Orthodox calendar